Pardubice District(German: Bezirk Pardubitz) is a district (okres) within the Pardubice Region of the Czech Republic. Its capital is the city of Pardubice.

Overview
Pardubice District is the smallest district of the region but has the highest population density. Its terrain is mostly flat, dominated by Kunětice Mountain. Agriculture specialises on grain, cattle feed and vegetables. Chemical, engineering and electrotechnical industries are the most important. The city of Pardubice is one of the main focuses of cultural life. Among the city's tourist attractions are the historical center of Pardubice, Kunětice Mountain Castle, the baroque castle in Choltice, the African museum dedicated to Emil Holub in Holice and the recreational area around the river Elbe.

Transport
Pardubice has an international airport and is a busy railway center. The once important Elbe River transport is in depression. A new highway (in the direction to Olomouc) is planned to relieve congestion on the roads.

List of municipalities
Barchov -
Bezděkov -
Borek -
Brloh -
Břehy -
Bukovina nad Labem - 
Bukovina u Přelouče -
Bukovka -
Býšť -
Časy -
Čeperka -
Čepí -
Černá u Bohdanče -
Choltice -
Choteč -
Chrtníky -
Chvaletice -
Chvojenec -
Chýšť -
Dašice -
Dolany -
Dolní Roveň -
Dolní Ředice -
Dříteč -
Dubany -
Hlavečník -
Holice -
Holotín -
Horní Jelení -
Horní Ředice -
Hrobice -
Jankovice -
Jaroslav -
Jedousov -
Jeníkovice -
Jezbořice -
Kasalice -
Kladruby nad Labem -
Kojice -
Kostěnice -
Křičeň -
Kunětice -
Labské Chrčice -
Lány u Dašic -
Lázně Bohdaneč -
Libišany -
Lipoltice -
Litošice -
Malé Výkleky -
Mikulovice -
Mokošín -
Morašice -
Moravany -
Němčice -
Neratov -
Opatovice nad Labem -
Ostřešany -
Ostřetín -
Pardubice -
Plch -
Poběžovice u Holic -
Poběžovice u Přelouče -
Podůlšany -
Pravy -
Přelouč -
Přelovice -
Přepychy -
Ráby -
Rohovládova Bělá -
Rohoznice -
Rokytno -
Rybitví -
Řečany nad Labem -
Selmice -
Semín - 
Sezemice -
Slepotice -
Sopřeč -
Sovolusky - 
Spojil -
Srch -
Srnojedy -
Staré Hradiště -
Staré Jesenčany -
Staré Ždánice - 
Starý Mateřov -
Stéblová -
Stojice -
Strašov -
Svinčany -
Svojšice -
Tetov -
Trnávka -
Trusnov -
Třebosice -
Turkovice -
Uhersko -
Úhřetická Lhota -
Újezd u Přelouče -
Újezd u Sezemic -
Urbanice -
Valy -
Vápno -
Veliny -
Veselí - 
Vlčí Habřina -
Voleč -
Vysoké Chvojno -
Vyšehněvice -
Zdechovice -
Žáravice -
Živanice

References

External links
List of municipalities of the Pardubice District

 
Districts of the Czech Republic